Brigham City is a city in Box Elder County, Utah, United States. The population was 19,650 at the 2020 census, up from the 2010 figure of 17,899. It is the county seat of Box Elder County. It lies on the western slope of the Wellsville Mountains, a branch of the Wasatch Range at the western terminus of Box Elder Canyon. Brigham City saw most of its growth during the 1950s and 1960s but has seen a struggling economy and stagnating growth. It is near the former headquarters of ATK Thiokol, now Northrop Grumman, the company that created the solid rocket boosters for the Space Shuttle.

Brigham City is known for its peaches and holds an annual celebration called Peach Days on the weekend after Labor Day. Much of Main Street is closed off to cars, and the festival is celebrated by a parade, a car show, a carnival, and other activities.  The Church of Jesus Christ of Latter-day Saints (LDS Church) dedicated its fourteenth temple in Utah in Brigham City on September 23, 2012.

The city is the headquarters of the Northwestern Band of the Shoshone Nation, a federally recognized tribe of Shoshone people.

History
Mormon pioneer William Davis first explored the Brigham City area in 1850. He returned with his family and others a year later to create permanent homes. Brigham Young directed Lorenzo Snow to lead additional settlers to the site and foster a self-sufficient city at the site in 1853.

Snow directed both religious and political affairs in the settlement, eventually naming it Box Elder in 1855. When the town was incorporated on January 12, 1867, the name was changed to Brigham City in honor of Brigham Young. That same month, after the Utah legislature authorized a municipal election, residents elected Chester Loveland to be the town's first mayor. Brigham Young gave his last public sermon there in 1877 shortly before his death. In 1864, the cooperative movement began in earnest with the creation of a mercantile co-op store and was an important element of the United Order. Other industries were added, and the Brigham City Co-op is widely recognized as the most successful of the Mormon Co-op ventures. Economic hardships brought an end to the Co-op in 1895, though the Co-op had first started selling businesses off in 1876.

World War II brought a major economic boost to the city. The federal government created Bushnell General Hospital on Brigham City's south side to treat soldiers wounded in the war. Locals sold supplies and food to the hospital while hospital staff patronized local businesses. After the war, the hospital's buildings were used as Intermountain Indian School. Many young Native Americans attended the boarding school until it closed in 1984, although the Intermountain "I" on the mountain is still visible in tandem with Box Elder High School's "B". The facility has left its mark in a number of other ways, with most of the buildings still standing. Some have been converted into businesses and condos, while others remain empty. Utah State University purchased the site and demolished all remaining buildings in 2013. The Utah State University Brigham City regional campus will be expanded to permanent buildings on this site and will mainly serve students from Box Elder, Weber, and Davis counties. Construction will begin in the fall of 2014.

Despite layoffs over the past decade, much of Brigham City's economy relies on Thiokol, the creator of many missiles, as well as the solid rocket booster for the Space Shuttle. Additionally, the local Autoliv (formerly a part of Thiokol) airbag plants also net Brigham City many jobs. Nucor Corporation has two facilities in Brigham City, in addition to its steel mill nearby Plymouth. The addition of a Walmart distribution center in nearby Corinne has also brought new jobs.

Historic sites

Baron Woolen Mills
Built in 1870 as part of the Brigham City Manufacturing and Mercantile Association, the mill produced high-quality blankets and sweaters from locally produced wool fleeces. It was damaged by a blaze in June 2014 and destroyed by a fire on July 20, 2015.

Cooley Memorial Hospital
Dr. A.D. Cooley opened this hospital in 1935, operating as the only acute care facility in Brigham City until 1976, when the Brigham City Community Hospital opened.

Hotel Brigham
Originally built to house transient railroad workers, rooms in Hotel Brigham were meant to be inexpensive. Very few rooms had bathrooms. An original owner was James Knudson, a former mayor of Brigham City. His grandson, Cameron Kay Harmon, became a part owner and managed the hotel after World War II and into the 1950s.

Brigham City Archway Sign
Installed on 6 September 1928, this sign was financed by citizen donations totaling $2,400. The sign spans the width of Main Street, welcoming visitors to the business district. Made of opalite glass, the  lettering welcomes all to Brigham City, "Gateway to the World's Greatest Wild Bird Refuge."

Brigham City Cemetery
Established in 1853 with the burial of a pioneer infant, the Brigham City cemetery is a beautiful, old-fashioned cemetery with above-ground grave markers. A final resting place for pioneers, peach orchard farmers, cholera epidemic victims, workers, and a host of others, the cemetery is peaceful and shaded with a wide variety of grand old trees.

List of mayors

Geography
Brigham City lies in southeastern Box Elder County on the western slopes of the Wellsville Mountains, a branch of the Wasatch Range, at the western end of Box Elder Canyon. Brigham City is generally considered to be the northern end of the Wasatch Front. To the west is a large, flat region of desert scrub, eventually giving way to marshlands on the edge of the Great Salt Lake. Interstates 15 and 84 pass to the west of the city together. U.S. 89 approaches from the south and U.S. 91 comes from I-15/84 to the west. They intersect in the city, climbing through Box Elder Canyon together. Two routes of the Utah Transit Authority's bus system also provide access to Brigham City from Ogden, and it also has a Greyhound bus stop. It is planned to be the northern terminus of the FrontRunner commuter rail line by 2020.

The climate of Brigham City is generally similar to that of the rest of the Wasatch Front, though slightly cooler. According to the Köppen climate classification, Brigham City has a humid continental climate (Dfb). Precipitation is light, averaging  annually. Summers are hot, but humidity remains low and overnight temperatures are cool, and winters are cold (but rarely frigid). May is the wettest month, while July is the driest.

Demographics

As of the census of 2000, there were 17,411 people, 5,526 households, and 4,409 families residing in the city. The population density was 1,216.4 people per square mile (469.8/km). There were 5,838 housing units at an average density of 407.9 per square mile (157.5/km). The racial makeup of the city was 91.26% White, 0.24% African American, 1.63% Native American, 0.77% Asian, 0.10% Pacific Islander, 4.07% from other races, and 1.93% from two or more races. Hispanic or Latino of any race were 7.67% of the population.

There were 5,526 households, out of which 44.7% had children under the age of 18 living with them, 66.4% were married couples living together, 9.7% had a female householder with no husband present, and 20.2% were non-families. 18.0% of all households were made up of individuals, and 8.2% had someone living alone who was 65 years of age or older. The average household size was 3.09 and the average family size was 3.53.

In the city, the age distribution of the population shows 34.2% under the age of 18, 11.1% from 18 to 24, 25.2% from 25 to 44, 17.4% from 45 to 64, and 12.1% who were 65 years of age or older. The median age was 29 years. For every 100 females, there were 100.9 males. For every 100 females age 18 and over, there were 96.9 males.

The median income for a household in the city was $42,335, and the median income for a family was $46,891. Males had a median income of $39,271 versus $22,061 for females. The per capita income for the city was $15,503. About 7.3% of families and 8.7% of the population were below the poverty line, including 9.7% of those under age 18 and 7.1% of those age 65 or over.

Religion
Latter-day Saint - 80.5%
Unaffiliated - 14.4%
Catholic - 2.9%
Protestant - 2.1%
Other - 0.2%

Arts and culture
Brigham City has museums covering the area's art and history (the Brigham City Museum-Gallery) and natural history (the Box Elder Museum). There is an LDS tabernacle in downtown Brigham City, as well as a temple. The city is located in a prime historical and environmental region. Nearby attractions include Golden Spike National Historic Site, which lies northwest of the city near Promontory Summit. State Route 13 heads northwest from Brigham City and turns north at Corinne. However, State Route 83 continues west from there and eventually reaches Lampo Junction, where the turnoff to the historic site is located. The work of art known as the Spiral Jetty lies west-southwest of this site. The Bear River Migratory Bird Refuge lies directly west of Brigham City on the northeast side of the Great Salt Lake at the mouth of the Bear River.

Festivals
 Brigham City Arts Festival
 Fourth of July Celebration
 Brigham City Peach Days

Education

Public schools
Brigham City is part of the Box Elder School District. Schools include:
 Box Elder High School (Grades: 10 - 12)
 Sunrise High School (Alternative Grades: 10 - 12)
 Box Elder Middle School (Grades: 8 - 9)
 Adele C. Young Intermediate School (Grades: 6 - 7)
 Discovery Elementary School (Grades: K - 5)
 Foothill Elementary School (Grades: K - 5)
 Lake View Elementary School (Grades: K - 5)
 Mountain View Elementary School (Grades: K - 5)

Post secondary
Utah State University-Brigham City and Bridgerland Technical College are located in Brigham City.

Notable people
 Rob Bishop, former teacher at Box Elder High; former member of United States House of Representatives for Utah's 1st congressional district
 Lew Christensen, ballet dancer and choreographer; director of San Francisco Ballet during 1950s
 Steve Christiansen, member of the Utah House of Representatives
 Willam Christensen, founder of Ballet West and San Francisco Ballet; brought complete Russian ballet The Nutcracker to United States
 William J. Critchlow, Jr., general authority of LDS Church
 Joseph Howell, former U.S. Representative
 Portia Nelson, Broadway singer
 Charles W. Nibley, presiding bishop of LDS Church, member of church's First Presidency
 Boyd K. Packer, President of the Quorum of Twelve Apostles of the LDS Church; taught LDS seminary in Brigham City
 Larry L. Richman, directs publishing, websites, and social media for LDS Church
 Morris D. Rosenbaum, prominent businessman in early Utah, one of few Jewish people to join LDS Church during 19th Century
 Garth Smith, pianists/composer/musician
 Lorenzo Snow, fifth president of the Church of Jesus Christ of Latter-day Saints (LDS Church). Lived in the city; is buried in the Brigham City cemetery

In popular culture
Brigham City was the namesake of American movie director, producer, writer, and actor Richard Dutcher's 2001 film Brigham City about murder in a fictitious small Mormon town, although it is not actually about the real Brigham City. Due to geography and population, the movie was actually filmed some 120 miles to the south in Mapleton, Utah.

Movies that have scenes filmed in Brigham City include The Work and the Story, Species, and Clay Pigeons.

The company Smith's Food and Drug was started in Brigham City.

The company Flying J was started in Brigham City and operated there as one of the largest privately held companies until a few years ago when it relocated its headquarters to Ogden, Utah.

The LDS Church President Brigham Young, for whom Brigham City is named, gave his final public address in the city. He gave this address in a public square that is now home to the Brigham City Museum-Gallery.

The LDS prophet Lorenzo Snow is buried in the Brigham City Cemetery.

In 2012 an LDS temple was built across from the historic Box Elder Stake Tabernacle.

See also

 List of cities and towns in Utah
 Brigham City Airport
 Brigham City Utah Temple
 Smith's Food and Drug

References

 Rebecca Anderson, "The Baron Woolen Mills: a Utah Legend," Utah Historical Society, volume 75, number 2, Spring 2007, 116–133.
 John G. Turner, "Brigham Young : Pioneer Prophet," Belknap Press, pp. 512

External links

 
 Self-guided tour of Brigham City historic sites

 
Cities in Utah
County seats in Utah
Populated places established in 1851
1851 establishments in Utah Territory
Cities in Box Elder County, Utah